The Truth is the debut solo studio album by American country music singer Brady Seals, and his first solo album after leaving the country band Little Texas. It was released on February 25, 1997, on Reprise Records. The album includes the singles "Another You, Another Me", "Still Standing Tall", and "Natural Born Lovers". Of these, only "Another You, Another Me" reached Top 40 on Hot Country Songs. Seals co-wrote all but two of the album's songs, and co-produced the album with Rodney Crowell.

Track listing

Chart performance

1997 debut albums
Reprise Records albums
Brady Seals albums
Albums produced by Rodney Crowell